Hidden Away is a 2020 Italian biographical drama film co-written, directed and co-edited by Giorgio Diritti. It stars Elio Germano as Italian painter Antonio Ligabue, who lived a notoriously reclusive life, troubled with physical problems and mental illness.

It was selected to compete for the Golden Bear in the main competition section at the 70th Berlin International Film Festival. At Berlin, Elio Germano won the Silver Bear for Best Actor.

Plot
The story of the painter Antonio Ligabue, with flashbacks showing glimpses of his childhood and his Swiss-Italian origins. Little Antonio is entrusted to adoptive parents and immediately begins to have psychophysical disorders, ill with rickets, and after being expelled from school and attacking his mother, he is hospitalized several times in an asylum.

But at the same time, Antonio finds comfort in painting and sculpture, often depicting exotic animals, such as lions, horses, gorillas, tigers, which he unites with the Emilian landscape, as Antonio will move to Gualtieri in Emilia, where he is derogatively called "El Tudesc" (The German).

However, Ligabue is soon discovered by the critic Renato Marino Mazzacurati, who encourages him to continue with his works, and to participate in art exhibitions and conferences in the province, until Ligabue is slowly discovered and appreciated by critics, although branded by certain academics as a naïve artist.

Cast

Release
The film premiered in competition at the 70th Berlin International Film Festival on 21 February 2020. The film was scheduled to be released in Italy on 27 February 2020, by 01 Distribution, but it was indefinitely postponed due to the coronavirus outbreak in the country.

Reception
The film received critical acclaim at the Berlin Film Festival. The Upcoming gave it five stars out of five.

Awards and nominations

 70th Berlin International Film Festival (2020)
 Silver Bear for Best Actor to Elio Germano
 Nomination for Golden Bear
 33rd European Film Awards (2020)
 European Film Award for Best Cinematographer to Matteo Cocco 
 European Film Award for Best Costume Designer to Ursula Patzak 
 Nomination for European Film Award for Best Actor to Elio Germano
 David di Donatello (2021)
 David di Donatello for Best Film
 David di Donatello for Best Director to Giorgio Diritti
 David di Donatello for Best Actor to Elio Germano
 David di Donatello for Best Cinematography to Matteo Cocco
 David di Donatello for Best Sets and Decorations to Ludovica Ferrario, Alessandra Mura and Paolo Zamagni
 David di Donatello for Best Hair Design to Aldo Signoretti
 David di Donatello for Best Sound to Carlo Missidenti, Filippo Toso, Luca Leprotti, Marco Biscarini and Francesco Tumminello
 Nomination for David di Donatello for Best Producer to Carla Degli Esposti
 Nomination for David di Donatello for Best Original Screenplay to Giorgio Diritti, Tania Pedroni and Fredo Valla
 Nomination for David di Donatello for Best Costumes to Ursula Patzak
 Nomination for David di Donatello for Best Makeup to Giuseppe Desiato and Lorenzo Tamburini
 Nomination for David di Donatello for Best Visual Effects to Rodolfo Migliari
 Nomination for David di Donatello for Best Editing to Paolo Cottignola and Giorgio Diritti
 Nomination for David di Donatello for Best Score to Marco Biscarini and Daniele Furlati
 Nomination for David di Donatello for Best Song to Invisible by Marco Biscarini

References

External links
 

2020 films
2020 biographical drama films
2020s Italian-language films
Italian biographical drama films
Biographical films about painters
Films set in Emilia-Romagna
Films postponed due to the COVID-19 pandemic
Cultural depictions of Italian men
Cultural depictions of 20th-century painters
2020s Italian films